Jamides candrena is a butterfly of the family Lycaenidae. It was described by Gottlieb August Wilhelm Herrich-Schäffer in 1869. It is found on Fiji.

References

 Jamides candrena at Parfait Image

Butterflies described in 1869
Jamides
Taxa named by Gottlieb August Wilhelm Herrich-Schäffer
Butterflies of Oceania